Frida Still Life is a 1983 Mexican drama film directed by Paul Leduc. The film was selected as the Mexican entry for the Best Foreign Language Film at the 58th Academy Awards, but was not accepted as a nominee.

Cast
 Ofelia Medina as Frida Kahlo
 Juan José Gurrola as Diego Rivera
 Max Kerlow as Leon Trotsky
 Claudio Brook as Guillermo Kahlo
 Salvador Sánchez as David Alfaro Siqueiros
 Cecilia Toussaint as Frida's Sister
 Ziwta Kerlow as Trotsky's Wife
 Margarita Sanz as Frida's friend

Plot
Frida Still Life opens with Frida Kahlo's coffin laid out in the Bellas Artes palace in Mexico City. Throughout the film, we see a series of flashbacks of Kahlo's life as she lies on her deathbed. The flashbacks show her relationship with Diego Rivera and Leon Trotsky, as well as her artwork, miscarriages, and physical ailments.

Critical response
Frida Still Life has been classified as a prime example of New Latin American Cinema of the 1960s and early 70s by film scholars such as Paul A. Schroeder Rodríguez, especially in the way it depicts Frida Kahlo as a marginalized subject. Additionally, film critics admire its use of mirrors as a way to show Kahlo's unique point of view.

Awards
The film was honored with the Gran Coral as the Best Picture of the 1984 Havana Film Festival of New Latin American Cinema (NCLA), and Ofelia Medina, in the role of Frida, received a Coral as the Best Actress.

See also
 List of submissions to the 58th Academy Awards for Best Foreign Language Film
 List of Mexican submissions for the Academy Award for Best Foreign Language Film

References

External links
 

1983 films
1983 drama films
1980s biographical drama films
Mexican biographical drama films
1980s Spanish-language films
Cultural depictions of Frida Kahlo
Cultural depictions of Leon Trotsky
Films directed by Paul Leduc
Biographical films about painters
1980s Mexican films